The Allard Pierson Museum is the archaeological museum of the University of Amsterdam.  It is situated at the Oude Turfmarkt 127 in Amsterdam, the Netherlands. Artifacts from the ancient civilizations of ancient Egypt, the Near East, the Greek World, Etruria, and the Roman Empire are curated and exhibited in this museum.

Allard Pierson
The name of the Allard Pierson Museum derives from the first professor of classical archaeology at the University of Amsterdam, Allard Pierson (1831–1896). This former clergyman was invited in 1877 to occupy the chair of Aesthetics, Art History, and Modern Languages at the newly founded university. His passion for antiquity, fuelled by his travels to the Mediterranean area, led to his assembling a collection of plaster casts from 1877 to 1895.

Founding
The second professor of archeology at the University of Amsterdam, Jan Six, had a large personal collection of books and antique objects. At his death in 1926, the university had an interest in acquiring his collection. In 1932, Pierson's son Jan Lodewijk established the Allard Pierson Foundation in order to make the antiquities collection available for research and teaching. The collection was brought to a building on the Weesperzijde in Amsterdam, with the top floor serving as a museum.

The collection grew due to purchases, gifts, and loans of artifacts and documents. On 12 November 1934, the Allard Pierson Museum was officially opened in a building at Sarphatistraat 129-131 (corner of the Roeterstraat). The museum eventually outgrew its building.

Building
A new building became available when the Nederlandse Bank vacated their office at the Oude Turfmarkt in 1976. H.R.H. Princess Beatrix attended the re-opening of the museum on 6 October 1976.

Collection
The museum has collections related to the ancient civilizations of Egypt, the Near East, the Greek World, Etruria, and the Roman Empire. The collections include art objects and utensils dating from 4000 BC to 500 AD. There are also scale models of ancient temples and buildings. In the Ancient Egypt exhibition there is a room dedicated to death, with mummies, sarcophagi, and a film showing the process of mummification. The plaster-cast attic, to be visited only with a guided tour, shows copies of Roman and Greek statues.

The museum's Greek pottery collection features examples of black-figure and red-figure pottery produced in the fifth and sixth centuries BC. A collection of Roman sarcophagi is also on display, including a rare wooden coffin from around 150 AD that is carved partly in the shape of the man within it.

In February 2014, it took place the international exhibit "Crimea: Gold and Secrets of the Black Sea", which included Scythian art objects from four museum located in Crimea and from an additional one that was in Ukraine. It was the largest crossborder exhibit of Ukrainian treasures ever organized until then. One months later, the Annexation of Crimea by the Russian Federation created an international dispute on the artifacts' property because the Allard Pierson Museum had signed a series of agreements both with the Ukrainian Minister of Culture and with the single five donator institutions, which meanwhile had entered within the Crimean-Russian jurisdiction. In the seek of a resolution, the art works remained in the Netherlands.

The Society of Friends 
The exhibitions and activities of the museum are supported by the Society of Friends of the Allard Pierson Museum, established in 1969. The Society has around 1500 members at present.

References

External links
 
 

1934 establishments in the Netherlands
Archaeological museums in the Netherlands
Egyptological collections
History of Amsterdam
Museums in Amsterdam
Museums established in 1934
Museums of ancient Greece in the Netherlands
Museums of Ancient Near East in Europe
Museums of ancient Rome in the Netherlands
Plaster cast collections
University museums in the Netherlands
University of Amsterdam